The Holešov barracks incident was a conflict between the Soviet soldiers and  members of the 7th Parachute Regiment of special deployment of the Czechoslovak People's Army. Czechoslovak paratroopers prevented Soviet soldiers from entering the Holešov barracks during the invasion of the Warsaw Pact troops into Czechoslovakia during the incident.

Events
Around 5 a.m. on 21 August 1968, an elite tank battalion from Lviv entered Holešov, which in the following hours surrounded the Holešov barracks. The Soviet command made it extremely important to surround the elite airborne units of the Czechoslovak army even before their commanders recovered. He failed to do so. The Czechoslovak paratroopers, who belonged to the elite of the army and who were trained to carry out diversions, were woken up at three o'clock in the morning by a battle alarm. The commanders of the barracks, led by lieutenant colonel Vladimír Košan, decided to defend the barracks. It was the only barracks in the whole of Czechoslovakia that did not fall under the control of the Soviet Army on August 21. The first clash took place at the gate of the barracks. When a Soviet soldier at the gate of the barracks asked: "How come you have weapons?", he received the answer "You have them too!". The paratroopers refused to surrender the barracks and were ready to fight. They were armed with plastic explosives, anti-tank missiles, submachine guns and parachutes. In the morning, the paratroopers received a message from the command of the Intelligence Administration of the General Staff (military intelligence) that the leading representatives of the Communist Party of the Soviet Union had been kidnapped. At the same time, they were given the task of freeing them and bringing them back. The paratroopers tried to get information about Alexandr Dubček's whereabouts. Reports were inconclusive. According to some, Dubček was supposed to be in a secret location in Czechoslovakia, others spoke of Poland or the area of ​​the former Subcarpathian Rus. Therefore, on the night of August 21–22, ten armed men in civilian clothes were secretly taken out of the barracks in Holešov, at which the guns of the Soviet tanks were aimed, to guard strategic objects in the city, and sixty men with weapons and supplies to the nearby forests as a preparatory phase for eventual action. The 60-member detachment continued in groups to the village of Přílepy via the shooting range in Dobrotice, where it hid in dugouts. After three days of waiting in the forest, however, the commando returned to the barracks in silence. It became clear that Dubček and other Czechoslovak politicians are already in Moscow, and the plan to rescue them is therefore unrealistic. In the end, there was no armed conflict. The Holešov soldiers managed to convince the Soviets to turn the tanks' guns to the opposite side. After a few days, the occupiers retreated to the surrounding streets and fields. Later, they anchored by the forest in Přílep, a few kilometers away, where they stayed until October.

Aftermath
The soldiers of the 7th Parachute Regiment were accused of anti-Soviet attitudes and the unit was disbanded in 1969. Some of the soldiers and commanders moved to other units.

Holešov paratroopers together with other intelligence units from Zbiroh and Litoměřice also ensured free radio broadcasting with their radios. All of them were subsequently accused of high treason.

The commander of the regiment was lieutenant colonel Vladimír Košan (1927–2010), but also the chief of staff, Major Jiří Dufek (1932–2018) and the former commander of the regiment Miroslav Šedina (1930–2010), who at the time served in the Intelligence Service of the General Staff which was superior to Holešov unit, were dismissed from the army and politically persecuted.

The communist regime tried to hide the incident from the public, like other inconvenient events for it. The soldiers did not lose contact with each other, and after the fall of the regime in 1994, they founded the Holešov Airborne Veterans Club. In addition to a number of beneficial activities, they annually commemorate the dramatic events of August 1968. In December 2018, the President of the Senate, Jaroslav Kubera, awarded them a commemorative certificate of the Senate.

Cultural impact
Several publications mention the 7th Parachute Regiment of special deployment in Holešov. These include, for example, the work of Daga Minkewitzová Paratroopers: 60 years at the head of the army from 2007, the work of František Sovadina the 88th: 77th Parachute Regiment of special deployment Holešov 1961–1969 from 2008 or two works of Jiří Dufek Special purpose units: From Prešov to Holešov 1957 – 1969 from 2011 and VÚ 7374 from 2013.

References

Battles involving Czechoslovakia
Battles involving the Soviet Union
Battles and conflicts without fatalities
Warsaw Pact invasion of Czechoslovakia
1968 in Czechoslovakia
Military history of Czechoslovakia